The Mirboo North railway line was a country branch line in Victoria, Australia. It branched from the main Gippsland line at Morwell station, and opened in three stages from 1885 to 1886. The stations along the line were Hazelwood, Yinnar, Boolarra, Darlimurla and Mirboo North.

The line remained in continuous service until it was closed in 1974, although the passenger service ceased in 1968. The section between Boolarra and Mirboo North has been converted into the Grand Ridge Rail Trail. Part of the former right-of-way between Morwell Junction and Hazelwood has been consumed by the coal mine for the Hazelwood power station.

Notes

References
 Fiddian, M (1997). "Trains, Tracks, Travellers".
 http://www.vrhistory.com/VRMaps/

Further reading

External links

Closed regional railway lines in Victoria (Australia)
Railway lines opened in 1885
Transport in Gippsland (region)
City of Latrobe
Shire of South Gippsland